All The Bells is a 2006 and 2012 artwork by Martin Creed.

Original work
The work was originally given in San Juan, Puerto Rico, in October 2006, where it attracted little favourable attention. Its rubric was:  All of the bells in a city or town rung as quickly and loudly as possible for three minutes (or in Spanish, Todas las campanas en una ciudad o pueblo sonando tan rápido y duro como sea posible por tres minutos). 
The work was a collaboration between the Candela Art & Music Festival, Escuela de Artes Plásticas, Galeríía Comercial, Gavin Brown's Enterprise, Mima and César Reyes and SunCom.

London 2012
The piece, under the title Work No. 1197: All The Bells, with the revised rubric, All the bells in a country rung as quickly and as loudly as possible for three minutes, was subsequently re-commissioned, for a sum rumoured to be between thirty-five and fifty thousand pounds, and advertised as being a new work, by the London 2012 Festival. The Central Council of Church Bell Ringers declined to participate. The Council's President, Kate Flavell, criticised both the timing and content of the piece in her official blog.

References

2012 Cultural Olympiad
Public art in the United Kingdom
Works by Martin Creed
Conceptual art